Charles Johnson (died July 23, 1802) was a Congressional representative from North Carolina. Johnson was born in Scotland; engaged as a planter; elected to the Continental Congress in 1781, 1784, and 1785, but did not attend; served in the state senate in 1781–1784, 1788–1790, and 1792 (and as Speaker in 1789 after the death of Richard Caswell); elected as a Republican in a special election to the Seventh Congress (serving from March 4, 1801 until his death on July 23, 1802 in Bandon, near Edenton, North Carolina); interment in Edenton Cemetery.

Biography

Johnson served in the North Carolina Senate representing Chowan County, North Carolina from 1781 to 1784 and from 1788 to 1792.

Johnson built the original section of the Strawberry Hill plantation home.

See also 
 Seventh United States Congress
 List of United States Congress members who died in office (1790–1899)

References

 "CSR Documents by Johnston, Charles." Colonial and State Records of North Carolina. Documenting the American South, University of North Carolina at Chapel Hill. https://docsouth.unc.edu/csr/index.html/creators/csr10613 
 U.S. Congress Biographical Directory entry
OurCampaigns.com OurCampaigns.com

1802 deaths
People from Edenton, North Carolina
North Carolina state senators
American planters
Democratic-Republican Party members of the United States House of Representatives from North Carolina
18th-century American politicians
19th-century American politicians
Year of birth unknown